Sperry may refer to:

Places
In the United States:
Sperry, Iowa, community in Des Moines County
Sperry, Missouri
Sperry, Oklahoma, town in Tulsa County
Sperry Chalet, historic backcountry chalet, Glacier National Park, Montana
Sperry Glacier, located in Glacier National Park in the state of Montana
William Miller Sperry Observatory or Sperry Observatory, an astronomical observatory owned by Union County College and operated by Amateur Astronomers, Incorporated on Union County College on their Cranford, New Jersey campus

Sperry Corporation
Sperry Corporation, a former American equipment and electronics manufacturer (1910–1986)
Sperry Gyroscope Company (1910–1933), founded by Elmer Ambrose Sperry
Lawrence Sperry Aircraft Company (1918–1924), founded by Lawrence Sperry
Sperry Corporation, 1933–1955
Sperry Rand, 1955–1978
Sperry Corporation, 1978–1986
Honeywell v. Sperry Rand, a landmark U.S. federal court case that in April 1973 invalidated the 1964 patent for the ENIAC

Other uses
Sperry (surname)
Sperry & Hutchinson, a brand of trading stamps
Sperry Top-Sider, a brand of boat shoes
The Secrets of Jonathan Sperry, an American film released in 2009
USS Charles S. Sperry (DD-697), a former US Navy destroyer
USS Sperry (AS-12), Fulton-class submarine tender in the United States Navy